The 2022 G20 Bali summit was the seventeenth meeting of Group of Twenty (G20), which was held in Nusa Dua, Bali, Indonesia on 15–16 November 2022. Indonesia's presidency began on 1 December 2021, leading up to the summit in the fourth quarter of 2022. The presidency handover ceremony was held as an intimate event, in which the G20 presidency gavel was transferred from Italian Prime Minister Mario Draghi to  Indonesian president Joko Widodo at the close of the Rome summit.

Background
Initially, Indonesia was slated to host the G20 Summit in 2020. However, as Indonesia will also hold the Chairmanship of ASEAN in 2023, India which was slated to hold the summit in 2022 agreed to exchange presidency timings with Indonesia. “Indonesia will hold the G20 Presidency in DEC 2022 while India will hold the Presidency a year after,” said Retno. Indonesia's presidency commenced on 1 December 2021, following the transfer of presidency from Italian Prime Minister Mario Draghi to  Indonesian president Joko Widodo at the closing of the Rome summit.

Preparations
The Indonesian government budgeted Rp 674 billion (~USD 45 million) for the G20 events. For the event's security, the Indonesian government deployed around 10,000 police officers and 18,000 soldiers, including 6,000 soldiers from Kodam IX/Udayana headquartered in Bali. Shortly before, during, and after the summit, flights to Bali's I Gusti Ngurah Rai International Airport became restricted, with limited operating hours for commercial aircraft and a ban against commercial aircraft staying overnight. Some flights are redirected to nearby airports in Surabaya, Lombok, and Makassar.

Venue
Due to the COVID-19 pandemic, the economy of the tourism-dependent Bali had been devastated, with the G20 summit event being seen as an opportunity to boost tourism to the island to pre-pandemic levels. The main venue of the summit is at The Apurva Kempinski Hotel of Nusa Dua, in Badung Regency. Other venues that also took part of the G20 summit were Bali International Convention Center for the media center, Sofitel Bali Nusa Dua Beach Resort for the Spouse Program, Ngurah Rai Grand Forest Park for a mangrove planting session and Garuda Wisnu Kencana Cultural Park for the gala dinner as well as the traditional performances.

Issues

Russia and Ukraine 
Following the Russian invasion of Ukraine, some countries called for Russian president Vladimir Putin to be excluded from the G20. In March 2022, Polish economic development minister Piotr Nowak said that he had presented a proposal to exclude Russia in meetings with the United States, which United States president Joe Biden subsequently indicated support for. China's Ministry of Foreign Affairs spokesperson Wang Wenbin rejected these calls, saying that no member had the right to remove another country as member. Canadian Prime Minister Justin Trudeau said the group should "re-evaluate" Russia's participation. The Indonesian government initially attempted to keep the Russian invasion of Ukraine off of the meeting's agenda. Foreign Minister Retno Marsudi said her country's government would consider the views and suggestions of other members but that summit is meant to focus on pandemic and economic recovery.

In April 2022, United States Secretary of the Treasury Janet Yellen said she will not participate in sessions at the Bali summit which include Russian delegates. At the 2nd Finance Ministers and Central Bank Governor Meeting several weeks later, various finance officials including Yellen, President of the European Central Bank Christine Lagarde, Canadian Deputy Prime Minister Chrystia Freeland, and Ukrainian Finance Minister Serhiy Marchenko walked out when a Russian delegate began to speak at the event. At a press conference several days later, Freeland said that Canada wanted Russia removed from G20, and that Canadian delegates would not take part in meetings that included Russia. She said the removal of Russia was a significant topic of conversation among the delegates at the meetings, though there was not unanimity that Russia should be removed. 

Indonesia's President Joko Widodo in April invited President of Ukraine, Volodymyr Zelenskyy, to the conference, while Putin confirmed in a phone call with Widodo that he would also attend the conference. Australian Prime Minister Anthony Albanese indicated that he would attend the conference regardless of Russia's presence. Trudeau also stated that Canada would still attend the conference if Putin were to attend. Following the 2022 G7 summit, German chancellor Olaf Scholz noted that the G7 leaders "did not want to drive G20 apart", and European Commission head Ursula von der Leyen noted that she would not oppose attending the conference with Putin. Italian Prime Minister Giorgia Meloni claimed she would be attending.

On 10 November 2022, the Russian embassy in Jakarta confirmed that Putin would skip the G20 summit, with Foreign Affairs Minister Sergey Lavrov instead attending in his place.

Outcome

Russo-Ukrainian War

During the summit, US President Joe Biden said that he and Chinese leader Xi Jinping jointly agreed that Russia should not use nuclear weapons in Ukraine while Chinese state media outlet Xinhua said that Chinese Foreign Minister Wang Yi told his Russian counterpart Sergei Lavrov that Moscow's position of eschewing nuclear warfare showed the country’s "rational" and "responsible" attitude. Ukrainian president Volodymyr Zelenskyy addressed the meeting virtually, referring to it as the "G19" in a snub against Russia. The Washington Post reported that China along with Russia opposed the usage of the word  “war” to describe Russia’s invasion of Ukraine and its inclusion into the text of the G20’s final communiqué. The joint declaration eventually included a statement that "most members" condemned Russia's invasion, although also acknowledging "that there were other views and different assessments of the situation".

Due to the 2022 missile explosion in Poland, the summit's schedule was briefly interrupted on the second day as G7 and NATO leaders in the summit held an emergency meeting. Russian foreign minister Sergey Lavrov had left the summit late in the first day, prior to the incident. Many of the G20 leaders also declined to be photographed along with Lavrov or a Russian delegation, resulting in the lack of a G20 "family photo" in 2022.

US-China relations

In the leadup to the conference, US officials had contacted their Chinese counterparts in order to arrange a meeting between Biden and Xi, and the meeting between the two occurred on 14 November, taking three hours. The meeting was designated to help restore relations and communication between the two countries, which had deteriorated following the 2022 visit by Nancy Pelosi to Taiwan. Biden later declared that there would not be a "new Cold War" between the US and China. although the two leaders did not declare an agreement on the Taiwan question.

Indonesian decarbonisation
The G7 countries, EU, Denmark and Norway announced a 20 billion US-dollar deal to decarbonise Indonesia's coal-powered economy, the so-called Indonesia Just Energy Transition Partnership.

Participating leaders

Participating invited guests

Absent guests 
Prime Minister of Cambodia, as well as 2022 Chairperson of Association of Southeast Asian Nations, Hun Sen cancelled his attendance and returned back to Cambodia before the start of the summit because he was tested positive for COVID-19.

Participating international organization guests

References

2022 conferences
2022 in Indonesia
2022 in international relations
21st-century diplomatic conferences (Global)
21st century in Bali
Diplomatic conferences in Indonesia
2022 Bali
Events affected by the 2022 Russian invasion of Ukraine
November 2022 events in Indonesia